National Radio Network may refer to:
National Radio Network (United States) in the United States
National Radio Network (Japan) in Japan
National Radio Network (UK) in the United Kingdom

See also
NRN (disambiguation)